Cerebellar stroke syndrome is a condition in which the circulation to the cerebellum is impaired due to a lesion of the superior cerebellar artery, anterior inferior cerebellar artery or the posterior inferior cerebellar artery.

Cardinal signs include vertigo, headache, vomiting, and ataxia.

Cerebellar strokes account for only 2-3% of the 600,000 strokes that occur each year in the United States. They are far less common than strokes which occur in the cerebral hemispheres. In recent years mortality rates have decreased due to advancements in health care which include earlier diagnosis through MRI and CT scanning. Advancements have also been made which allow earlier management for common complications of cerebellar stroke such as brainstem compression and hydrocephalus.

Research is still needed in the area of cerebellar stroke management; however, several factors may lead to poor outcomes in individuals who have a cerebellar stroke. These factors include:
 Declining levels of consciousness
 New signs of brainstem involvement
 Progressing Hydrocephalus
 Stroke to the midline of the cerebellum (a.k.a. the vermis)

References

Further reading

External links 

 Image of cerebellar stroke
 Images of cerebellar stroke at MedPix

Stroke
Syndromes affecting the cerebellum